Arras – Roclincourt Airfield  is a recreational aerodrome located in Roclincourt,  northeast of Arras, both communes of the Pas-de-Calais department in the Hauts-de-France region of France.

Facilities

References

External links
  CCI d'Arras
 
 

Airports in Hauts-de-France
Transport in Pas-de-Calais
Buildings and structures in Pas-de-Calais